Jesuit High School is a private Catholic, all-male high school run by the U.S. Central and Southern Province of the Society of Jesus in Tampa, Florida. The school was established in 1899 by the Jesuits and operates independently of the Roman Catholic Diocese of Saint Petersburg. The school teaches a college preparatory curriculum and has been named a Blue Ribbon School of Excellence.

The Jesuit motto is Ad Majorem Dei Gloriam which means "For the Greater Glory of God."  The school encourages its students to be "Men For Others," which is a student model derived from a famous 1973 speech given by Jesuit Father General Pedro Arrupe. Fr. Arrupe led the Jesuits in the transitional years after Vatican II, from 1965 to 1983, when the Jesuit order incorporated that Council's vision into its institutions.

History
Jesuit High School was founded in 1899 as Sacred Heart College and affiliated with Sacred Heart Parish, then a Jesuit-run parish.  This was in downtown Tampa at the corner of Florida Avenue and Madison Street.

By the mid-1950s enrollment had exceeded the capacity of the original facility. Father Michael Kennelly, S.J., who served as the school's president and rector from 1953 until 1959, spearheaded a $600,000 capital campaign and the purchase of 80 acres of rural grazing land on Himes Avenue in West Tampa, where the school moved in 1956. Kennelly had obtained the necessary permits and designed the new campus, which he centered around St. Anthony's Chapel.

Jesuit High School had an enrollment of 245 students at the time of its relocation in 1956, and as of August 2015 had approximately 775 students. Jesuit has been rated first among all-boys schools in Florida and second among Catholic schools.

Curriculum

Jesuit's curriculum includes subjects in mathematics, sciences, fine arts, language arts, foreign language, social studies, physical education, and, for all students, four years of theology. Of the more than 90 members of the faculty, several are Jesuit priests. The Jesuits serve in administration, teaching, and campus ministry. Daily Masses are held in the Jesuit chapel at 7:30am and 5:00pm and a monthly all-school Mass in the newly built Chapel of the Holy Cross. School years begin with the traditional Mass of the Holy Spirit. Those who are not Catholic or not Christian are welcome among the student body and faculty and staff.

Athletics
The school won the FHSAA Boys' Athletic Program of the Year award in 1997–1998, and had the most state championships and places at state events in many subsequent years. The Tigers are at or near the top of the FHSAA's annual All-Sports Award standings, a.k.a. the Floyd E. Lay Sunshine Cup, establishing Jesuit as arguably the best high school sports program in all classifications in Florida. The school won the Tampa Tribune Athletic Program of the Year award in 2003–2004, and the St. Petersburg Times Athletic Program of the Year award in 2004–2005. Jesuit teams have combined to win 26 state titles in eight sports: soccer (7), baseball (5), cross country (4), basketball (3), swimming (3), football (2), and one in both track & field and wrestling, with all but four of these titles occurring since the mid-1990s.

Jesuit also has had 60 individual and relay State Champions in 56 events in swimming, wrestling, track & field, cross country, and tennis. Most recently Jesuit has earned team State Championships in swimming in 2017, 2018, and 2020, along with wrestling and soccer State Championships in 2020 and baseball in 2019. The school also has won two High School National Championships in baseball in 1997 and soccer in 2001, and was undefeated and ranked No. 1 nationally in baseball when the 2020 season was cut short due to COVID-19.

Jesuit's baseball stadium, Paul Straub Field at Hyer Family Park, was declared the best high school baseball field in the country by the National High School Baseball Coaches Association in 2011. The school's chief sports rival is the Crusaders of nearby Tampa Catholic High School.

Clubs and extracurricular activities

In 2013–14 Jesuit students gave more than 44,000 hours of community service as part of their mandatory service requirement. Jesuit is committed to serving those in need, and its students annually serve more than 40,000 hours of community service. Students are required to meet community service hour requirements for advancement to the next grade level and to graduate. They often far surpass those required hours, via personal initiative and service-oriented clubs at Jesuit, such as the award-winning Key Club and Environmental Club,

Jesuit has some 50 clubs to provide students with a wealth of extracurricular opportunities for enhancing their skills and leadership abilities. The Speech and Debate Club has sent seven members to Chicago and a policy team to district nationals twice. Other clubs include SADD, National Honor Society, language honor societies, Agmen Christi, Don't Feed the Artists, "Jesuit Masque" drama troupe, and the 'Tiger newspaper and yearbook. There is a very active school spirit club, Blue Tide, which is a noteworthy presence at sports events.

Facilities
To the north of the chapel are the cafeteria, fine arts building, and Jesuit residence.  Classroom buildings surround the remaining sides of the chapel.  The "Tiger Palace" can accommodate an audience of 1,400. The southeast portion of the campus is the home of the renovated athletic center, which was dedicated to alumnus and Major League Baseball Hall of Famer Al López, and the library dedicated to Fr. Richard Hartnett, S.J. Recently, the chapel has been replaced by a larger one and plans are complete for a comprehensive multipurpose building with cafeteria and arts and theater rooms, in a $35 million project.

Notable alumni
Jesuit has graduated many political leaders, priests, teachers, physicians, journalists, scientists, attorneys, professional athletes, writers, scholars, actors, painters, engineers, entrepreneurs, and, according to Nick Suszynski, Director of Development, 15 judges. The Alumni Association commonly refers to the high school as "Tampa's largest fraternity."

Education, science, and medicine
 Michael W. Doyle, international relations scholar and Columbia University professor
 John M. Kovac, astronomer at Harvard–Smithsonian Center for Astrophysics; led the BICEP2 team that discovered the apparent existence of primordial gravitational waves
 Lt. Gen. Douglas Robb, Joint Staff Surgeon, Office of the chairman, Joint Chiefs of Staff at The Pentagon

Entertainment
 Bert Kreischer, comedian
 Kevin Ebel - radio personality on Tampa Bay’s morning Krewe 99.5 QYK
 Lionel, nationally syndicated talk radio personality
 Joe Malenko (a.k.a. Jody Simon), former pro wrestler in the WCW, ECW and UWF; son of Boris "The Great Malenko"

Politics
 Philip Agee, CIA officer
 Jim Davis, US Congressman
 Charles R. Wilson, circuit judge, US Court of Appeals for the Eleventh Circuit

Sports

Baseball
 Sam Dyson, former MLB relief pitcher
 Tommy Eveld, baseball player
 Joe Hudson, former MLB catcher with the Los Angeles Angels
 Al López, former MLB player, manager, all-star, and 1977 Hall of Famer
 Dave Magadan, former MLB player, 1986–2001; MLB coach: 2002–19
 Sam Marsonek, former MLB pitcher with the New York Yankees
 Lance McCullers Jr., current MLB starting pitcher for the Houston Astros and 2017 World Series champion.
 Jason Michaels, former MLB player from 2001 to 2011
 Lou Piniella, 1969 American League Rookie of the Year and 1990 World Series winning manager
 Kevin Quackenbush, current MLB relief pitcher for the Los Angeles Dodgers
 Brad Radke, former MLB pitcher with the Minnesota Twins
 Shane Robinson, current MLB player with the New York Yankees
 Terry Rupp, former college baseball coach and 1998 NCAA Division II Baseball Championship winner
 Ken Suarez, former MLB player, 1966–73
 Marc Valdes, former MLB pitcher, 1995–2001

Football
 Anthony Allen, former NFL and CFL running back, and Super Bowl XLVII champion.
 Xavier Beitia, former AFL and NFL Europe kicker
 Dane Belton, current NFL player for the New York Giants
 Malik Davis, current NFL player for the Dallas Cowboys
 Jay Feely, former NFL kicker, 2001–14 and sportscaster for CBS Sports.
 Leonard George, first ever African-American player and football scholarship at the University of Florida
 George Godsey, current NFL assistant coach and former Georgia Tech quarterback
 Chris Martin, former NFL player with the San Diego Chargers
 Rich McKay, current NFL executive, 1993–present
 Garrett Rivas, former AFL kicker
 Garrison Sanborn, former NFL player with the San Francisco 49ers
 Robert Weiner, former high school football coach and current Toledo co-offensive coordinator.

Other sports
 Joie Chitwood III, former President of both the Daytona International Speedway and the Indianapolis Motor Speedway
Mark Dickson, former ATP tennis player and four-time All-American at Clemson University
Joe Donoho, former professional soccer player for FC Tampa Bay

Miscellaneous
 Jules Dervaes, urban farmer and leader in California's urban homesteading movement
 Frank Llaneza, cigar maker
 C. Michael Petters, President and CEO of Huntington Ingalls Industries.

See also
 List of Jesuit sites

References

External links
 Jesuit High School of Tampa website
 History of Jesuit High School of Tampa
 List of Jesuit High alumni in baseball
 Jesuit High School of Tampa Athletic Program

Educational institutions established in 1899
Jesuit high schools in the United States
Catholic secondary schools in Florida
Jesuit New Orleans Province
Boys' schools in the United States
High schools in Tampa, Florida
1899 establishments in Florida
Roman Catholic Diocese of Saint Petersburg